Guy Dewey "Gump" Cantrell (April 9, 1904 – January 31, 1961) was a pitcher in Major League Baseball. He pitched from 1925 to 1930.

External links

1904 births
1961 deaths
People from Coal County, Oklahoma
Baseball players from Oklahoma
Major League Baseball pitchers
Brooklyn Robins players
Philadelphia Athletics players
Detroit Tigers players
McAlester Miners players
Okmulgee Drillers players
Jersey City Skeeters players
Toronto Maple Leafs (International League) players
Little Rock Travelers players
Oklahoma City Indians players
St. Joseph Saints players
Hollywood Stars players
Tulsa Oilers (baseball) players